The  opened in 1991 in Hiratsuka, Kanagawa Prefecture, Japan. The collection of approximately twelve thousand objects has a particular focus on the Shōnan area.

Vicinity

See also
 Museum of Modern Art, Kamakura & Hayama
 List of Cultural Properties of Japan - paintings (Kanagawa)

References

External links
  Hiratsuka Museum of Art

Museums in Kanagawa Prefecture
Hiratsuka, Kanagawa
Art museums and galleries in Japan
Art museums established in 1991
1991 establishments in Japan